Crassispira comasi is a species of sea snail, a marine gastropod mollusk in the family Pseudomelatomidae.

Description

Distribution
This marine species occurs off Cuba at depths between 30 m and 54 m.

References

 Fernández-Garcés R. & Rolán E. (2010) A new species of the genus Crassispira (Gastropoda, Turridae) from Cuba. Gloria Maris 49(3-4): 84-88

External links

comasi
Gastropods described in 2010